Alicea is a surname. Notable people with the surname include:

Francisco Parés Alicea, Puerto Rican accountant and government official
Geraldo Alicea (born 1963), American politician
Ismael Alicea (1954–2015), American librarian
Jose Alicea Mirabal (born 1967), Puerto Rican basketball player
Luis Alicea (born 1965), Puerto Rican baseball player
William Alicea Pérez, Puerto Rican politician

Fictional characters
Vitin Alicea, a Puerto Rican television and radio character